Haroobhai Mehta (born 12 October 1933) is an Indian politician and lawyer. He was elected to the Lok Sabha, lower house of the Parliament of India from Ahmedabad in 1984 as a member of the Indian National Congress.

References

External links
 Official biographical sketch in Parliament of India website

India MPs 1984–1989
Indian National Congress politicians
1933 births
2001 deaths
Lok Sabha members from Gujarat
Indian National Congress politicians from Gujarat